Teng is a Chinese surname derived from State of Teng (Imperial clan descendants) in the Western Zhou Dynasty. It is the 73rd name on the Hundred Family Surnames poem. It is T'eng in Wade–Giles, Tàhng in Cantonese and is usually Romanized as "Tang" in Hong Kong.  It is Têng in Hokkien and Teochew.It is "ddàng"in Wenzhou.

"Teng" can also be used as an alternate spelling of the Chinese surname Deng (鄧/邓, Dèng) used especially in Taiwan based on the Wade-Giles transliteration of Mandarin Chinese.  This spelling is used in many English language sources on China written before the widespread adoption of the pinyin transliteration system in the 1980s. For example, Deng Xiaoping was written "Teng Hsiao-p'ing."

Notable persons with the surname Teng

Persons surnamed Teng (滕) include:

Teng Biao (滕彪), formerly Beijing-based human rights lawyer now in exile
Dr. Rev. Philip Jinhui Teng (滕近輝), Christian theologian and author
Teng Haibin (滕海滨), gymnast from Beijing, China
Joyce Tang (滕麗名), Hong Kong celebrity
Teng Xiu (滕脩), Wu minister during the Three Kingdoms period
Teng Yin (滕胤), Wu minister during the Three Kingdoms period
Empress Teng (滕皇后), empress of Eastern Wu during the Three Kingdoms period of China
Shanghua Teng (滕尚华, born 1964) Chinese-American computer scientist
Teng Zhiqiang (滕志强; born 1991 in Gaocun, Mayang, Hunan), a Chinese male slalom canoeist
Kai-Wei Teng (born 1998), Taiwanese baesball player

Unknown
Tara Teng, Canadian abolitionist
Vienna Teng, (stage name) born Cynthia Yih Shih (史逸欣), American singer-songwriter and pianist

References

See also
Tais Teng, pseudonym of a Dutch writer
Chinese name
Teng (mythology)

Chinese-language surnames
Individual Chinese surnames